Biphasic sleep (or diphasic, bifurcated, or bimodal sleep) is the practice of sleeping during two periods over the course of 24 hours, while polyphasic sleep refers to sleeping multiple times—usually more than two. Each of these is in contrast to monophasic sleep, which is one period of sleep within 24 hours. Segmented sleep and divided sleep may refer to polyphasic or biphasic sleep, but may also refer to interrupted sleep, where the sleep has one or several shorter periods of wakefulness, as was the norm for night sleep in pre-industrial societies. A common form of biphasic or polyphasic sleep includes a nap, which is a short period of sleep, typically taken between the hours of 9 am and 9 pm as an adjunct to the usual nocturnal sleep period. Napping behaviour during daytime hours is the simplest form of polyphasic sleep, especially when the nap(s) are taken on a daily basis.

The term polyphasic sleep was first used in the early 20th century by psychologist J. S. Szymanski, who observed daily fluctuations in activity patterns (see Stampi 1992). It does not imply any particular sleep schedule. The circadian rhythm disorder known as irregular sleep-wake syndrome is an example of polyphasic sleep in humans. Polyphasic sleep is common in many animals, and is believed to be the ancestral sleep state for mammals, although simians are monophasic.

The term polyphasic sleep is also used by an online community that experiments with alternative sleeping schedules to achieve more wake time and/or better sleep each day.

Research
Polyphasic sleep can be caused by irregular sleep-wake syndrome, a rare circadian rhythm sleep disorder which is usually caused by neurological abnormality, head injury or dementia. Much more common examples are the sleep of human infants and of many animals. Elderly humans often have disturbed sleep, including polyphasic sleep.

In their 2006 paper "The Nature of Spontaneous Sleep Across Adulthood", Campbell and Murphy studied sleep timing and quality in young, middle-aged, and older adults. They found that, in free-running conditions, the average duration of major nighttime sleep was significantly longer in young adults than in the other groups. The paper states further:

Biphasic sleep 

One classic cultural example of a biphasic sleep pattern is the practice of siesta, which is a nap taken in the early afternoon, often after the midday meal. Such a period of sleep is a common tradition in some countries, particularly those where the weather is warm. The siesta is historically common throughout the Mediterranean and Southern Europe. It is the traditional daytime sleep of China, India, South Africa, Italy, Greece, Spain and, through Spanish influence, the Philippines and many Hispanic American countries.

A separate biphasic sleep pattern is sometimes described as segmented sleep, often consisting of going to sleep early at night, awakening in the post-midnight hours, and then returning to bed for a second period of sleep into the morning. In a New York Times article, author Jesse Barron asserts that this practice was common in the past: "in the preindustrial West, most people slept in two discrete blocks." Benjamin Franklin was a prominent example of this sleeping pattern.

The need for biphasic sleeping as essential to the health of children is described in the seminal nineteenth-century text "Street Music in the Metropolis: Correspondence and Observations on the Existing Law, and Proposed Amendments," published by John Murray:

Polyphasic sleep 
A 2021 review found no evidence supporting the benefits of polyphasic sleep but instead adverse physical, mental and performance effects.

Interrupted sleep
Interrupted sleep is a primarily biphasic sleep pattern where two periods of nighttime sleep are punctuated by a period of wakefulness. Along with a nap in the day, it has been argued that this is the natural pattern of human sleep in long winter nights. A case has been made that maintaining such a sleep pattern may be important in regulating stress.

As historical norm 
Historian A. Roger Ekirch has argued that before the Industrial Revolution, interrupted sleep was dominant in Western civilization. He draws evidence from more than 500 references to a segmented sleeping pattern in documents from the ancient, medieval, and modern world. Other historians, such as Craig Koslofsky, have endorsed Ekirch's analysis.

According to Ekirch's argument, adults typically slept in two distinct phases, bridged by an intervening period of wakefulness of approximately one hour. This time was used to pray and reflect, and to interpret dreams, which were more vivid at that hour than upon waking in the morning. This was also a favourite time for scholars and poets to write uninterrupted, whereas still others visited neighbours, engaged in sexual activity, or committed petty crime.

The human circadian rhythm regulates the human sleep-wake cycle of wakefulness during the day and sleep at night. Ekirch suggests that it is due to the modern use of electric lighting that most modern humans do not practice interrupted sleep, which is a concern for some writers. Superimposed on this basic rhythm is a secondary one of light sleep in the early afternoon.

The brain exhibits high levels of the pituitary hormone prolactin during the period of nighttime wakefulness, which may contribute to the feeling of peace that many people associate with it.

The modern assumption that consolidated sleep with no awakenings is the normal and correct way for human adults to sleep, may lead people to consult their doctors fearing they have maintenance insomnia or other sleep disorders. If Ekirch's hypothesis is correct, their concerns might best be addressed by reassurance that their sleep conforms to historically natural sleep patterns.

Ekirch has found that the two periods of night sleep were called "first sleep" (occasionally "dead sleep") and "second sleep" (or "morning sleep") in medieval England. He found that first and second sleep were also the terms in the Romance languages, as well as in the language of the Tiv of Nigeria. In French, the common term was premier sommeil or premier somme; in Italian, primo sonno; in Latin, primo somno or concubia nocte. He found no common word in English for the period of wakefulness between, apart from paraphrases such as first waking or when one wakes from his first sleep and the generic watch in its old meaning of being awake. In Old French an equivalent generic term is dorveille, a portmanteau of the French words dormir (to sleep) and veiller (to be awake).

Because members of modern industrialised societies, with later evening hours facilitated by electric lighting, mostly do not practice interrupted sleep, Ekirch suggests that they may have misinterpreted and mistranslated references to it in literature. Common modern interpretations of the term first sleep are "beauty sleep" and "early slumber". A reference to first sleep in the Odyssey was translated as "first sleep" in the 17th century, but, if Ekirch's hypothesis is correct, was universally mistranslated in the 20th.

In his 1992 study "In short photoperiods, human sleep is biphasic", Thomas Wehr had seven healthy men confined to a room for fourteen hours of darkness daily for a month. At first the participants slept for about eleven hours, presumably making up for their sleep debt. After this the subjects began to sleep much as people in pre-industrial times were claimed to have done. They would sleep for about four hours, wake up for two to three hours, then go back to bed for another four hours. They also took about two hours to fall asleep.

In extreme situations 
In crises and other extreme conditions, people may not be able to achieve the recommended seven to nine hours of sleep per day. Systematic napping may be considered necessary in such situations.

Claudio Stampi, as a result of his interest in long-distance solo boat racing, has studied the systematic timing of short naps as a means of ensuring optimal performance in situations where extreme sleep deprivation is inevitable, but he does not advocate ultrashort napping as a lifestyle. Scientific American Frontiers (PBS) has reported on Stampi's 49-day experiment where a young man napped for a total of three hours per day. It purportedly shows that all stages of sleep were included. Stampi has written about his research in his book Why We Nap: Evolution, Chronobiology, and Functions of Polyphasic and Ultrashort Sleep (1992). In 1989 he published results of a field study in the journal Work & Stress, concluding that "polyphasic sleep strategies improve prolonged sustained performance" under continuous work situations. In addition, other long-distance solo sailors have documented their techniques for maximizing wake time on the open seas. One account documents the process by which a solo sailor broke his sleep into between 6 and 7 naps per day. The naps would not be placed equiphasically, instead occurring more densely during night hours.

U.S. military
The U.S. military has studied fatigue countermeasures. An Air Force report states:

Canadian Marine pilots
Similarly, the Canadian Marine pilots in their trainer's handbook report that:

NASA
NASA, in cooperation with the National Space Biomedical Research Institute, has funded research on napping. Despite NASA recommendations that astronauts sleep eight hours a day when in space, they usually have trouble sleeping eight hours at a stretch, so the agency needs to know about the optimal length, timing and effect of naps. Professor David Dinges of the University of Pennsylvania School of Medicine led research in a laboratory setting on sleep schedules which combined various amounts of "anchor sleep", ranging from about four to eight hours in length, with no nap or daily naps of up to 2.5 hours. Longer naps were found to be better, with some cognitive functions benefiting more from napping than others. Vigilance and basic alertness benefited the least while working memory benefited greatly. Naps in the individual subjects' biological daytime worked well, but naps in their nighttime were followed by much greater sleep inertia lasting up to an hour.

Italian Air Force
The Italian Air Force (Aeronautica Militare Italiana) also conducted experiments for their pilots. In schedules involving night shifts and fragmentation of duty periods through the entire day, a sort of polyphasic sleeping schedule was studied. Subjects were to perform two hours of activity followed by four hours of rest (sleep allowed), this was repeated four times throughout the 24-hour day. Subjects adopted a schedule of sleeping only during the final three rest periods in linearly increasing duration. The AMI published findings that "total sleep time was substantially reduced as compared to the usual 7–8 hour monophasic nocturnal sleep" while "maintaining good levels of vigilance as shown by the virtual absence of EEG microsleeps." EEG microsleeps are measurable and usually unnoticeable bursts of sleep in the brain while a subject appears to be awake. Nocturnal sleepers who sleep poorly may be heavily bombarded with microsleeps during waking hours, limiting focus and attention.

Scheduled napping to achieve more time awake
There is an active community that experiments with alternative sleeping schedules to achieve more time awake each day, but the effectiveness of this is disputed.

Researcher Piotr Woźniak argues that the theory behind severe reduction of total sleep time by way of short naps is unsound, and that there is no brain control mechanism that would make it possible to adapt to the "multiple naps" system. Woźniak expresses concern that the ways in which the polyphasic sleepers' attempt to limit total sleep time, restrict time spent in the various stages of the sleep cycle, and disrupt their circadian rhythms will eventually cause them to experience the same negative effects as those with other forms of sleep deprivation or circadian rhythm sleep disorder. Woźniak claims to have scanned the blogs of polyphasic sleepers and found that they have to choose an "engaging activity" again and again just to stay awake and that polyphasic sleep does not improve one's learning ability or creativity.

There are many claims that polyphasic sleep was used by polymaths and prominent people such as Leonardo da Vinci, Napoleon, and Nikola Tesla, but there are few if any reliable sources confirming these. One first person account comes from Buckminster Fuller, who described a regimen consisting of 30-minute naps every six hours. The short article about Fuller's nap schedule in Time in 1943, which referred to the schedule as "intermittent sleeping", says that he maintained it for two years, and notes that "he had to quit because his schedule conflicted with that of his business associates, who insisted on sleeping like other men."

See also

Tahajjud
Tikkun Chatzot
Watchkeeping

References

Further reading

External links
 

Sleep
Circadian rhythm